Timothy James Bralower is an American Micropaleontologist and Professor of Geosciences at The Pennsylvania State University. His research focuses on Abrupt Climate Change and Mass Extinction. Professor Bralower has co-authored 174 publications. He has participated in five expeditions with the International Ocean Discovery Program to the Caribbean Sea, Indian and Pacific Oceans, and served as co-chief scientist of Leg 198 in the Pacific.  He served as Department Head of the Department of Geosciences in the College of Earth and Mineral Sciences at The Pennsylvania State University from 2003 to 2011.  He is a former Fulbright Senior Scholar and a Fellow of the Geological Society of America.

Education
Bralower attended Oxford University and received undergraduate degree in Earth Science, he received his Ph.D. in Earth Sciences at Scripps Institution of Oceanography at the University of California San Diego.

Research
Bralower's research focuses on the response of ancient calcareous plankton (nannoplankton and planktic foraminifera) to rapid environmental change, including abrupt global warming during the Paleocene-Eocene Thermal Maximum (PETM) 56 million years ago and the Cretaceous Oceanic Anoxic Events (OAEs) 93-120 million years ago 2, 3. His research group has studied the impact of warming and changing ocean circulation during the PETM on plankton in the oceans, including the development of short-lived populations that arose during the event. Bralower's research group also focuses on the causes and consequences of the mass extinction at the Cretaceous-Paleogene boundary 66 million years ago, including the recovery of nannoplankton and cyanobacteria4, 5. He participated in the drilling of the Chicxulub crater by the International Ocean Discovery Program in 2016 where he contributed to studies on the origin of nuclear winter that led to mass extinction6 the survival of cyanobacterial communities and the ensuing recovery of higher trophic levels7, 8.

Selected publications

See also
TNT equivalent
Anoxic event

References

Pennsylvania State University faculty
American scientists
University of North Carolina at Chapel Hill faculty
Living people
Year of birth missing (living people)